Albert Valentin (1908–1968) was a Belgian screenwriter and film director.

Selected filmography
 Song of Farewell (1934)
 Stradivarius (1935)
 The Strange Monsieur Victor (1938)
 Marie-Martine (1943)
 The Secret of Monte Cristo (1948)
 Mammy (1951)
 Madame du Barry (1954)
 The Affair of the Poisons (1955)
 The Changing of the Guard (1962)
 Destination Rome (1963)

References

1908 births
1968 deaths
People from La Louvière
Belgian screenwriters
Belgian film directors
20th-century screenwriters